The 4th Robert Awards ceremony was held in 1987 in Copenhagen, Denmark. Organized by the Danish Film Academy, the awards honoured the best in Danish and foreign film of 1986.

Honorees

Best Danish Film 
  - Helle Ryslinge

Best Screenplay 
 Helle Ryslinge -

Best Actor in a Leading Role 
  -

Best Actress in a Leading Role 
  -

Best Actor in a Supporting Role 
  -

Best Actress in a Supporting Role 
 Sofie Gråbøl – The Wolf at the Door

Best Cinematography 
 Morten Bruus & Tom Elling for The Dark Side of the Moon & Før gæsterne kommer

Best Production Design 
 Leif Sylvester Petersen – The Dark Side of the Moon

Best Costume Design 
 Manon Rasmussen – Barndommens gade

Best Makeup 
 Erik Schiødt –

Best Special Effects 
 Stig Sparre-Ulrich & Niels Arnt Torp – Barndommens gade

Best Editing 
  –

Best Score 
 Anne Linnet – Barndommens gade

Best Documentary Short 
 Asian Heart – kone pr. postordre – Malene Ravn & Bodil Trier

Best Short Featurette 
 Gæsterne kommer -

Best Foreign Film 
 My Life as a Dog – Lasse Hallström

See also 

 1987 Bodil Awards

References

External links 
  

1986 film awards
1987 in Denmark
Robert Awards ceremonies
1980s in Copenhagen